Age of Bronze is an American comics series by writer/artist Eric Shanower retelling the legend of the Trojan War. It began in 1998 and is published by Image Comics.

Overview

The series aims to be true to all literary traditions, from Homer's Iliad to Shakespeare's Troilus and Cressida, as well as to the archaeology of the Bronze Age Aegean. When complete it is projected to comprise seven volumes.

Publications

34 issues, four trade paperback collections and two specials have been published as of 2015.

Collected volumes

A Thousand Ships (2001) collects issues 1 to 9, in which Helen, wife of the king of Sparta, is abducted by the Trojan prince Paris, and the Greeks gather their armies for war in response.
Sacrifice (2004) collects issues 10 to 19, in which the progress of the Greek army is held up, until their king, Agamemnon, pays a debt he owes to the gods.
Betrayal, Part One (2008) collects issues 20–26, in which Agamemnon's fleet sails to Troy and his envoys negotiate with King Priam.
Betrayal, Part Two (2013) collects issues 27–33.

Specials and one-shots

 Age of Bronze: Special, published in 1999, provides backstory, telling of the curse on Atreus and his sons, Agamemnon and Menelaus.
 Age of Bronze: Behind the Scenes, published in 2002, gives an insight into Shanower's research and working methods.

Status
After a six year hiatus issue 34 was published in 2019, the first to be in color. Individual issues will henceforth be solely digital except a handful printed to fulfill existing print subscriptions. No further print subscriptions will be accepted. Book collections are being reissued in color. Plans are to publish two issues a year.

Awards
Shanower won the Eisner Award for best writer/artist in 2001 and 2003, and was nominated for the Ignatz Award for outstanding artist in 1999, for his work on Age of Bronze.

References

External links
 Official website

Trojan War literature
Image Comics titles
Comics set in ancient Greece
1998 comics debuts
Classical mythology in comics
LGBT-related comics